Peck Memorial Library is a historic library building located at Marathon in Cortland County, New York.  It is a -story brick structure constructed in 1894–1895.  It is eclectic in style and typical of Late Victorian architecture.

It was listed on the National Register of Historic Places in 1992.

References

External links
Friends Of Peck Memorial Library

Library buildings completed in 1895
Libraries on the National Register of Historic Places in New York (state)
Buildings and structures in Cortland County, New York
National Register of Historic Places in Cortland County, New York